Mosby's Confederacy is a 2008 turn based strategy  and real time tactics video game by Tilted Mill Entertainment.

Overview
In Mosby’s Confederacy the player plays as John S. Mosby and commands small bands of skirmishers, scouts and guerilla fighters on opportunistic missions to scout, ambush, steal supplies and harass larger and better armed forces of Union soldiers.

Development
Mosby's Confederacy was first announced for development on October 6, 2008, with a release date set tentatively for later in the fall. Tilted Mill stated in an interview that the game would be downloadable in the same vein as their fantasy RPG-village building game Hinterland.

References

External links
Mosby's Confederacy official site
press release

2008 video games
Video games developed in the United States
Windows games
Windows-only games
Real-time tactics video games
Turn-based tactics video games
American Civil War video games
Video games set in the United States
Single-player video games